Warren Whiteside (born 1 November 1961) is an Australian former cricketer. He played 21 first-class cricket matches for Victoria between 1983 and 1988.

See also
 List of Victoria first-class cricketers

References

External links
 

1961 births
Living people
Australian cricketers
Victoria cricketers
Cricketers from Melbourne